Carne Ross (born 1966) is the founder and executive director of Independent Diplomat, a diplomatic advisory group.

Career 
After graduating from Exeter University, Ross joined the British Foreign Office and worked at the UK embassy in Bonn, Germany before moving to the UK mission to the UN.

He resigned from the Foreign Office after 15 years of service, citing his secret evidence to the Butler Review as the reason. In 2007, he is a supporter of a UN Parliamentary Assembly. In 2004, he founded the non-governmental organisation Independent Diplomat.

Publications and documentary 

Ross published a book called Independent Diplomat: Dispatches from an Unaccountable Elite in 2007 and a book called The Leaderless Revolution in 2011. He wrote a play called The Fox.

In the "Acknowledgements" section of his 2013 novel, A Delicate Truth, John le Carré thanks Ross for "his example demonstrat[ing] the perils of speaking a delicate truth to power."

In 2017, BBC4 broadcast a documentary about Ross's life and ideas called The Accidental Anarchist.  The documentary charts Ross's change from a civil servant in the Foreign and Commonwealth Office to an anarchist.  The linguist, cognitive scientist and political activist Noam Chomsky appears in the documentary.  Ross explores the philosophy of democratic confederalism developed by Abdullah Öcalan and its influence on Kurdish groups in the Syrian Civil War such as the YPG and YPJ.  Ross sees these groups as anarchist.

Personal life 

Ross is the grandson of linguist and academic Alan S. C. Ross.

Selected works

References

Further reading

External links 
 

1966 births
British anarchists
British diplomats
British expatriates in Zimbabwe
British whistleblowers
Living people
English twins